Kevin Daniel Williamson (born September 18, 1972) is an American conservative political commentator. He is the national correspondent for The Dispatch.  Previously, he was the roving correspondent for National Review.

Career
Williamson has worked as a deputy managing editor and theater critic for The New Criterion. Williamson has also worked at the Mumbai-based Indian Express Group; the Lubbock Avalanche-Journal; Journal Register Newspapers; the Institute for Humane Studies at George Mason University, where he directed the journalism and communication programs; and as an adjunct professor at The King's College.  Williamson was the editor of The Bulletin, a now-defunct daily newspaper in Philadelphia. Williamson was a longtime columnist at National Review. Williamson left National Review in 2022 and is currently employed by The Dispatch as a national correspondent.

In 2018, he briefly joined The Atlantic but his employment was terminated following public criticism of a 2014 Twitter discussion, in which he suggested hanging as a criminal punishment for abortion, as well as his reiteration of this suggestion on his National Review podcast in 2014.

Williamson later wrote that his comments had been intended to "mak[e] a point about the sloppy rhetoric of the abortion debate" rather than to promote capital punishment, noting that he had previously expressed strong reservations about capital punishment in general.

Bibliography 
 
 
 
 
 
 
 

Contributor
 
 

Publications

References

External links

 

Living people
1972 births
American political writers
American male journalists
National Review people
George Mason University faculty
The King's College (New York City) faculty
Journalists from New York City
20th-century American journalists
20th-century American male writers
21st-century American journalists
21st-century American male writers
People from Amarillo, Texas
Journalists from Texas